The Memorial Complex Adem Jashari is a monument in Donji Prekaz, Skenderaj, Kosovo. It is categorized by the government as "Architectural" and was built in honor of the family and life of the Kosovo Liberation Army fighter Adem Jashari, killed in action during the Kosovo War on March 7, 1998, during what was later known as the Attack on Prekaz.

Description
The Memorial Complex Adem Jashari includes both the houses and graves of several soldiers from the Jashari family. Therefore, it was placed under national heritage protection by the Assembly of the Republic of Kosovo. The graves of Shaban, Hamëz, and Adem are guarded by Sentinels from the Kosovo Security Force.

Gallery

References

External links
 Official website
 National cultural heritage register site

Monuments and memorials in Kosovo